Oliver Steurer (born 6 January 1995) is a German professional footballer who plays as a defender for VfB Oldenburg.

Career
After spending three years at 1. FC Heidenheim, he moved to MSV Duisburg in the summer of 2021. He left Duisburg in the summer of 2022. He moved to VfB Oldenburg afterwards on 1 July 2022.

Career statistics

References

External links

1995 births
Living people
Sportspeople from Gelsenkirchen
German footballers
Association football defenders
Schwarz-Weiß Essen players
Rot-Weiß Oberhausen players
Borussia Dortmund II players
1. FC Heidenheim players
KFC Uerdingen 05 players
SC Preußen Münster players
MSV Duisburg players
VfB Oldenburg players
2. Bundesliga players
3. Liga players
Regionalliga players
Oberliga (football) players
Footballers from North Rhine-Westphalia